Belmont is a village in the London Borough of Sutton, in South London, England. It is located off the A217 road and near to Banstead Downs in Surrey. It is a suburban development situated 10.8 miles (17.4 km) south-southwest of Charing Cross.

History
Belmont did not exist until the late 19th century. Belmont railway station opened in May 1865 and was originally called 'California Station', named after the California Arms public house on the opposite side of Brighton Road which was built by John Gibbons in approximately 1858. The station was renamed 'Belmont' in 1875, and the name was attached to the village that emerged subsequently. The original pub was heavily damaged by German bombing in the Second World War. The new building, built on the site in 1955, was known as "The California" later changed to 'The Belmont', but in 2014, under new management, reverted to its original name of 'The California'. St. John's Church (C of E) stands in Queens Road, near the end of the small High Street ("Station Road").

Banstead Hospital and the emergence of Belmont
The village of Belmont strongly owed its development to the presence of Banstead Asylum. Although located in the parish of Banstead, the asylum was much closer to the village and railway station of Belmont than those of Banstead. The site is now occupied by HM Prison High Down.

Belmont Hospital and the South Metropolitan District School
Belmont Hospital was a psychiatric hospital.  It closed and was demolished in the 1980s. The site is now occupied by the 'Belmont Heights' housing development, which is situated to the west of Brighton Road, to the north of Belmont village. Belmont Hospital opened after the Second World War. The premises had previously fulfilled a number of different institutional purposes. For example, during World War II it was used as an emergency hospital for military and civilian casualties, including psychiatric cases. The oldest buildings on the site, built in the early 1850s, had originally been a large Poor Law residential 'district' school belonging to the South Metropolitan Schools District. This institution catered for pauper children from several parishes in south-east London. Along with its nearby annex site, built in 1884 in Cotswold Road (formerly Banstead Road), this establishment closed in 1902. The premises at both sites were then acquired by the Metropolitan Asylums Board. Some of the buildings of the Cotswold Road site still exist.

Public institutions

The Royal Marsden Hospital is a specialist cancer treatment hospital.  It is an NHS Foundation Trust, and operates facilities on two sites, including one in Belmont, Sutton. The original buildings on the site were first used as the Banstead Road branch of the South Metropolitan District School, which was a 'district' school for children of workhouse inmates in south London. In the 1890s, girls were kept at the Banstead Road site and boys were kept at a site in Brighton Road, which was built in 1851. The Brighton Road site later became Belmont workhouse and Belmont Psychiatric hospital, before being demolished in the 1980s. The Banstead Road site later became a sanatorium, before the southern half of the site was acquired by Royal Marsden in 1962.
The Institute of Cancer Research is a public research institute and university located on two London sites and specialised in oncology. It was founded in 1909 as a research department of the Royal Marsden Hospital. It established its Belmont, Sutton campus site in 1956. It joined the University of London in 2003.  
Sutton Hospital

Green Space

In addition to Belmont Park, Belmont contains two Local Nature Reserves.

Cuddington Meadows is a Grade I Site of Borough Importance for Nature Conservation. The site was shown as two enclosures on the open Banstead Downs on an early nineteenth century map, and it was later part of Walnut Tree Farm, which became Cuddington Hospital in 1897. The hospital closed in 1984, and in the late 1990s the land was transferred to Sutton Council to be managed for nature conservation. It is mainly chalk grassland with some scrub. Its most important feature is a variety of unusual flowering plants, including greater knapweed, lady's bedstraw and field scabious.
Belmont Pastures is a Grade II Site of Borough Importance for Nature Conservation. It is a long narrow triangle north of Belmont railway station. It is an old meadow which formerly belonged to Belmont Hospital.

Just to the south of the village is Banstead Downs, which extends for around a mile further south towards neighbouring Banstead, Surrey.  Banstead Downs is a large Site of Special Scientific Interest, covering 430 acres (170 ha). Banstead Golf Course is on the northern slopes.

Economy
Station Road is the main commercial street of Belmont Village, containing a range of mainly independent shops and restaurants. It runs for about a quarter of a mile from Belmont Station in the east to St John's Church in the west.  One mile to the north lies the larger economic centre of Sutton. Nearby, Hyundai's Belmont Garage is located in here and many shops like Charlies Sweet Shop, Best-one, Eclipsehair, The California, Belmont Conservative Club, The Good Home, London and Belcher Florlist, Belmont Food and Wines, Modern Mortgage Solutions, May May House, Zest, Kirkby Pharmacy, SnowStar Dry Cleaners, Belmont Barbers, Curryzma, UK Windows Limited, Ann Charles Property Services, The Little Ironing and Dry Cleaning Shop, Belmont Chiropody Practice, Hair Studio, FM & LJ Stenning, Cafeina Cafe, Belmont Dental Practice, Village Bakers and Haweli.

Nearest places

 Sutton to the north
 Cheam to the west
 Banstead, Surrey to the south
 Carshalton to the east

Transport
Belmont railway station is on the Sutton to Epsom Downs branchline and the London Victoria to Epsom Downs line. It is part of the Sutton & Mole Valley Line services of the Southern rail operating company, and is in London Travelcard Zone 5. TFL Buses also run in this area.

Former residents

 James Hunt (1947–1993), World Formula One motor-racing champion 1976.
 Lord Judd (1935-2021) former director of Oxfam. As Frank Judd he was MP for constituencies in Portsmouth from 1966 to 1979.
 Don Lusher (1923–2006), trombonist and jazz band leader
 Lord Ritchie-Calder (1906–1982), journalist and environment expert
 Lionel Tertis (1876–1975), viola-player
 Barry Wordsworth (born in Cheam 1948), orchestral conductor – music director.
 David Bellamy (1933–2019), Botanist, author and academic.

References

Further reading (local history)
 Belmont: A Century Ago by Roland Sparkes, published December 2009. Paperback. . . This is first book dedicated to the history of the village. The introductory chapter provides a resume of Belmont's history and development in the Victorian era and the early 20th century.
 Articles by local historian Roland Sparkes for the Belmont Local History group (established 2009). E.g. Belmont: 1865 – A description of the Belmont area as it existed in 1865 , and Dr Carl Warburg, his Belmont laboratory, and his famous fever drug.
 Sutton Guardian newspaper – heritage page articles and features. 
 Sutton Scene (London Borough of Sutton's official newsletter), Oct/Nov 2009 edition. Feature on Belmont. 
 Two booklets have been produced about the history of Belmont's churches, both now out of print: (i) Splendid the Heritage: the story of Belmont and its Methodist Church (Craig, 1965); and (ii) A Village Church: the story of the first 75 years of St John’s with Belmont Methodists (Reed, 1992).
 The Brighton road; the classic highway to the south by Harper, Charles George, 1863-1943   Page 159 refers to the position of Belmont on the road between London and Brighton and the 1796 marking of "Little Hell" on the maps.

External links
 Belmont Local History group, 
 Map of Belmont area, Streetmap website, Streetmap.co.uk 

Areas of London
Districts of the London Borough of Sutton